Mnemonic Ascent is an Australian hip hop group made up of BVA (Sam Harris), and Raph Boogie (Rafael Rashid) from Adelaide with DJ Ransom (Phil Ivanov) from Melbourne. They release their albums through Raph Boogie's Crookneck Records.

Discography
The Outside Inn (2001) - Crookneck Records
The Book's Full (2005) - Crookneck Records

References

Australian hip hop groups